Avan is a 1985 Indian Tamil-language film, directed by Chozha Rajan and produced by K. R. Kannan. The film stars Arjun, Ilavarasi and Goundamani.

Plot

Cast 
Arjun
Ilavarasi
Goundamani

Soundtrack 
The music was composed by Shankar–Ganesh.

Reception
Jayamanmadhan of Kalki felt the film can be advertised as a film imposed with too many spicy ingredients like karate, love, affection and tears but praised the director for keeping the screenplay organized.

References

External links

1985 films
1980s Tamil-language films
Films scored by Shankar–Ganesh